Gustav Ludwig Heinrich Mützel (December 7, 1839 – October 29, 1893) was a German artist, famous for his mammal and bird paintings, including the illustrations for the second edition of Alfred Edmund Brehm's Thierleben and Richard Lydekker's The Royal Natural History.

Gustav Mützel was the son of the painter Heinrich Mützel and his wife Luise Pauline Friedrichs. He attended the French high school in his hometown. Subsequently Mützel began to study at the Academy of Art at age 18 and was, amongst others, a pupil of the painter Eduard Daege.

On 1 November 1865 Mützel married Anna Schönherr in Berlin and raised three children; Hans, Walter and Gertrud. Mützel and his wife settled in Königsberg in the Neumark, where he was active as photographer. To keep up with the latest technical developments in photography Mützel and his family moved to Berlin in 1870.

After the Franco-German War Mützel started illustrating some of the more important encyclopedias of the time. He created a large number of illustrations for the German Ornithological Society, having been a member since 1874. Mützel's diverse interests led also to his membership of the German Society for Anthropology, Ethnology and Prehistory and the Association of Berlin artists. The Nießen'sche Choral Society awarded him with an honorary membership.

Gustav Mützel died at his home (Hagelsberger Str. 10) at the age of 54 years on 29 October 1893 of heart and kidney ailments. He was interred at the cemetery in Mariendorf on 1 November.

Illustrated works 
 Alfred Brehm: Brehm's Thierleben
 Alfred Brehm: Vom Nordpol zum Äquator
 Brockhaus Konversationslexikon
 Friedrich Lichterfeld: Illustrirte Tierbilder. Schilderungen und Studien nach dem Leben
 Adolf Bernhard Meyer (Hrsg.): Unser Auer-, Rackel- und Birkwild und seine Abarten
 Joseph Meyer: Meyers Konversations-Lexikon
 Heinrich Nehrling: Die Nordamerikanische Vogelwelt
 Theodor D. Pleske: Ornithographia rossica („Die Vogelfauna des russischen Reiches“)
 Nikolai Michailowitsch Przewalski: Wissenschaftliche Resultate der von N. M. Przewalski nach Central-Asien unternommenen Reisen (2 Bde.)
 Friedrich Ratzel: Völkerkunde
 Anton Reichenow: Vogelbilder aus fernen Zonen
 Emil Adolf Roßmäßler: Das Süßwasseraquarium. Eine Anleitun und Pflege desselben
 Richard Schmid-Cabanis: Zoolyrische Ergüsse. Ein Album zwei-, vier- und mehrfüssiger Dichtungen
 Georg Schweinfurth: Im Herzen von Afrika. Reisen und Entdeckungen im zentralen Äquatorial-Afrika während der Jahre 1868-1871

External links 

 The Swedish translation of Brehm's Thierleben, with Mützel's illustrations in the first three of four volumes, has been digitized by Project Runeberg .

1839 births
1893 deaths
German illustrators
Animal artists
Französisches Gymnasium Berlin alumni
19th-century German painters
19th-century German male artists